The Lamar Hunt U.S. Open Cup, commonly known as the U.S. Open Cup (USOC), is a knockout cup competition in men's soccer in the United States of America. It is the oldest ongoing national soccer competition in that country.
The competition was first held during the 1913–1914 season as the National Challenge Cup, with Brooklyn Field Club winning a trophy donated by Thomas Dewar for the promotion of American soccer. It was renamed and dedicated to North American Soccer League (NASL) and Major League Soccer (MLS) executive Lamar Hunt by the United States Soccer Federation in 1999.

The 2022 U.S. Open Cup marked the return of the competition after the 2020 and 2021 tournaments were canceled due to the COVID-19 pandemic, ending 106 years of consecutive play.

In its current format, the U.S Open Cup is contested by approximately 100 clubs from the professional leagues sanctioned by the United States Soccer Federation – Major League Soccer (MLS), the United Soccer League's Championship and League One divisions, the National Independent Soccer Association (NISA), and MLS Next Pro – as well as amateur clubs in the earlier rounds of the tournament that qualify through their respective leagues. The overall champion is awarded $300,000 in prize money and a berth in the CONCACAF Champions League, while the runner-up receives $100,000, and the furthest-advancing team from each lower-division league receives $25,000. 

MLS teams have dominated the competition since the league began play in 1996. No lower division team has won the Open Cup since the Rochester Rhinos in 1999, and the most recent lower division team to reach the final was Sacramento Republic FC in 2022. The most recent champions of the competition, Orlando City SC, won their first title after defeating the Republic 3–0 in the 2022 final.

Format

The competition is a single-elimination tournament that has been contested by at least 80 teams since the 2014 edition. This pool consists of the American clubs in the professional leagues, which are Major League Soccer, the league now known as the USL Championship, USL League One and National Independent Soccer Association as well as amateur teams from the Premier Development League (now USL League Two), National Premier Soccer League, the United States Adult Soccer Association, and US Club Soccer. The first three rounds, consisting of amateur and lower-league teams, are played during consecutive weekdays in May with amateur teams advancing to face USL clubs in geographical pairings in the second round. The winner of each match progresses to the next round and the loser is eliminated from the tournament. MLS clubs enter play in the fourth round, matched geographically with the winners of the third round to play on a date in June that is determined by the home side specifically selected for non-interference with league games. After the fourth round, no new teams are introduced, leading to a quarterfinal round in July, a semifinal round in August, and a final match to determine the champion in September. Every match, including the final, lasts 90 minutes plus any additional stoppage time. If no clear winner has been determined after 90 minutes of normal time, 30 minutes of extra time is played. If the score is still level after extra time then the winner is decided by a penalty shoot-out.

Qualification
Through the 2011 edition, eight teams from each level of the American Soccer Pyramid took part in the competition proper, with each league narrowing its delegation separately in the spring before the competition officially began in the summer. In some cases, additional teams played in qualifying rounds to gain entry. One example was found with MLS clubs, as only the top six from the previous regular season received automatic bids, while the bottom U.S.-based MLS teams faced each other to qualify for the remaining two MLS slots.

Beginning in 2012, the competition was expanded from its previous 40 teams to 64, with the qualifying process radically changed. The National Premier Soccer League received six places, plus the possibility of a seventh in a playoff against a team from the amateur US Club Soccer setup. Nine clubs from the USASA earned places, as did 16 USL Premier Development League teams.  Each of these organizations has its own qualifying process to determine its entrants.  These 32 teams competed in the first round of the Cup, with the winners meeting all 16 USL Pro and NASL teams in the second round. The 16 U.S.-based MLS teams entered in the third round.

In 2013 the competition was expanded to 68 teams. All U.S.-based Division I, II and III teams participated in the tournament proper: 16 from Major League Soccer, six from the North American Soccer League and 12 from USL PRO. The remaining 34 spots in the tournament field were filled by amateur teams from the Adult Council category–16 from the Premier Development League, eight from U.S. Adult Soccer Association regional qualifying, eight from the National Premier Soccer League, one from US Club Soccer and one from the United States Specialty Sports Association.

The process for determining the site for the Open Cup tournament semifinals and final was changed in 2013. In past years, the sites for the final three matches of the tournament had been determined through a sealed-bid process, but in 2013 the hosts of those games were determined by a coin flip. Home teams throughout the entire tournament were determined by random selection.

Since 2008, the champion of the U.S. Open Cup has earned the right to play in the CONCACAF Champions League. The first team to represent the U.S. as Open Cup champion was 2007's winner, New England Revolution.

Starting in 2016, lower-division professional clubs owned by higher-division professional clubs are no longer eligible to participate in the U.S. Open Cup. This removed the MLS reserve clubs in USL from the 2016 competition, after issues of clubs holding back players from their USL sides in 2015 in order to keep them eligible to play for the parent MLS club.  Players are only allowed to play for one club in any US Open Cup season. Amateur clubs remain eligible to enter even if they are owned by professional clubs. Initially, "hybrid affiliate" clubs—i.e., lower-division professional clubs that are staffed but not owned by higher-division clubs—also remained eligible, but those clubs were also banned effective with the 2016 competition. This last change was proposed by the Houston Dynamo, which were the senior club to Rio Grande Valley FC Toros in the first such arrangement in the U.S. game; that arrangement ended after the 2021 season, and those two teams would be drawn against each other in 2022.

History

The competition dates back to 1913–1914, when it was known as the National Challenge Cup. In 1999, U.S. Soccer honored patron Lamar Hunt by changing the official title of the tournament to the Lamar Hunt U.S. Open Cup. The winners of the tournament were awarded the Dewar Cup, donated by Sir Thomas Dewar for the promotion of soccer in the United States in 1912, until it was retired due to poor condition in 1979. It was brought back into use by the United States Adult Soccer Association in 1997, but is now back on permanent display at the National Soccer Hall of Fame at Toyota Stadium in Frisco, Texas, and the recent winners of the tournament have been awarded a new, different trophy. Despite this, the name of each winning club is still added to the base of the original Dewar Cup.

The National Challenge Cup was the first truly national cup competition in the United States, as previous cups had been effectively relegated to regional status by the difficulties in coordination and travel caused by the size of the United States in the early 1900s. While U.S. Soccer had initially administered the competition, in 1985 they handed over management to the USASA. In 1995, U.S. Soccer resumed its administration of the competition.

Maccabee Los Angeles of California and Bethlehem Steel of Pennsylvania have both won the cup a record five times, while Greek American AA of New York and Seattle Sounders FC are tied for the record for most consecutive cup victories at three. The old NASL did not participate in the Open Cup.

Since MLS' debut in 1996, MLS clubs have won the cup in all but one of those years. The Rochester Rhinos of the 2nd division A-League were surprise winners in 1999, defeating four MLS clubs, including the Colorado Rapids 2–0 in the championship match. The first professional team to win in the modern era were the Richmond Kickers of the USISL (the predecessor to the A-League, later known as the USL First Division, USL Pro, United Soccer League, and now as the USL Championship) in 1995, one year before the start of MLS. D.C. United were the first MLS team to win in 1996.

The first round of the 2020 edition was suspended in March 2020 due to the COVID-19 pandemic. The tournament was canceled entirely in August 2020, with all qualified teams automatically qualified for the following year; however, the 2021 Open Cup was canceled as well, due to schedule congestion as an effect of the pandemic. The tournament resumed in 2022 with 71 professional clubs out of a total field of 103, both modern-era records.

Hosting 

Through the 2010 U.S. Open Cup, U.S. Soccer used sealed bids to award home matches. From 2011, U.S. Soccer uses a simple coin toss to decide which team hosts each match for most rounds. When the draw has more than two teams involved, such as the fourth round, U.S. Soccer uses a sealed envelope system. Four envelopes are opened, the first and second are home one and two followed by away one and two. This can be modified due to teams not applying to host and previous round winners not being able to be paired against each other.

Champions

Champions by number of titles

Champions by state

MLS honors

Player records

Career goals
The following is a table of the leading career goal scorers in the U.S Open Cup during the modern professional era (1995–present).

Season scoring leaders

Broadcasting 
ESPN+ had exclusive broadcast rights for the 2019 and 2022 Open Cups. Prior to 2019, the tournament had little broadcast exposure, with the final and select matches being broadcast on ESPN networks and all other matches streamed through the USSF's YouTube channel.

On March 1, 2022, U.S. Soccer and Turner Sports announced an 8-year exclusive multimedia rights deal for the United States men's and women's national teams. Cindy Parlow Cone, president of U.S. Soccer, confirmed in a separate interview that the new deal would include the Open Cup.

References

External links

TheCup.us
List of Open Cup finals at the RSSSF 

 
United States
Soccer cup competitions in the United States
Annual sporting events in the United States
1913 establishments in the United States
Recurring sporting events established in 1913